Hurricane Grill & Wings is a restaurant chain based in Florida. It has 71 locations in 15 U.S. states. It serves more than 30 signature sauces and rubs. It is known for its jumbo fresh wings and laid-back tropical vibe. It was named by USA Today as one of “10 Great Places to Wing It,” selected as one of the “Future 50” by Restaurant Business magazine and as one of Franchise Times “Top 40 Fast and Serious”. The original Hurricane Grill & Wings opened in Fort Pierce, Florida in 1995 and has expanded to locations in Alabama, Arizona, Colorado, Georgia, Iowa, Maryland, Michigan, Minnesota, New York, North Carolina and Texas, with additional restaurants planned across the United States.

History
Hurricane Grill & Wings was first opened by Chris Russo in April 1995 in Ft. Pierce, Florida. By January 2008 there were 30 locations in Florida, Georgia and Nevada. It was purchased by Fred Meltzer, president and CEO of the parent company of Hoffman's Chocolate Shoppes, in 2008.

On December 17, 2008, the franchisor was purchased by Hurricane AMT, LLC which is controlled by investor partners Gail Meyer Asarch and John C. Metz (Chairman and CEO).

In July 2009, Hurricane Grill & Wings was named to Restaurant Business magazine's Future 50, a listing of the fastest growing chains with annual sales between $25 and $50 million.

Martin O'Dowd was appointed president of Hurricane AMT on September 2, 2009. Previously, O'Dowd was CEO of three public restaurant companies over the past 20 years. Most recently he served as president and CEO of Famous Dave's of America in Minneapolis, where he developed the organization from 18 units in the Midwest into an 84-unit national concept.

On June 13, 2016, Hurricane AMT opened its first Fast Casual Restaurant called Hurricane BTW or Hurricane Burgers-Tacos-Wings in Ft. Lauderdale. AMT plans to open another 24 BTW units in 2017.

References

External links

Restaurant chains in the United States
1995 establishments in Florida
Restaurants established in 1995
Companies based in Palm Beach County, Florida